Mycinamicin VI 2''-O-methyltransferase (MycE) is an enzyme with systematic name S-adenosyl-L-methionine:mycinamicin VI 2''-O-methyltransferase. This enzyme catalyses the following chemical reaction:

 S-adenosyl-L-methionine + mycinamicin VI  S-adenosyl-L-homocysteine + mycinamicin III

The enzyme is involved in the biosynthesis of mycinamicin macrolide antibiotics.

References

External links 
 

EC 2.1.1